The 1950 World Table Tennis Championships – Swaythling Cup (men's team) was the 17th edition of the men's team championship.  

Czechoslovakia won the gold medal defeating Hungary 5–3 in the final. England and France both won a bronze medal after finishing second in their respective groups.

Medalists

Team

Swaythling Cup tables

Group A

+ United States and Netherlands both withdrew from Group A

Group B

Final

+ Kóczián withdrew injured after suffering from badly blistered feet

See also
List of World Table Tennis Championships medalists

References

-